The 2020 Prime Minister Cup was the fourth edition of the Prime Minister One Day Cup, the premier one-day cricket tournament in Nepal. The tournament was contested by teams representing the seven Provinces of Nepal as well as three departmental teams. It began on 15 January 2021 and ended on 30 January 2021. All matches of the tournament were broadcast live by DishHome's "Action Sports" channel. Nepal Police Club were the defending champions, but were eliminated at the semi-final stage by Armed Police Force Club. Tribhuwan Army Club won the title following a 33-run win over APF Club in the final.

Squads 
The ten participants were divided into two groups.

Group A

Group B

Points table

Group A 

 The top two teams qualified for the playoffs.Source: ESPNcricinfo

Group B 

 The top two teams qualified for the playoffs.Source: ESPNcricinfo

League matches

Playoffs

Semi finals

Final

References

External links 
Series home at ESPNcricinfo
Series home at cricnepal.com

Prime Minister Cup
Prime Minister Cup